Jonas Ljungblad (born January 15, 1979, in Gothenburg) is a Swedish former road racing cyclist. He began his professional career with the Amore & Vita team in 2002 as a young helper, but after spending a season with Team Bianchi his career began to skyrocket with a very successful Australian excursion in 2004 winning the Tour of Queensland and the Herald Sun Tour.

In 2005 he acquired his biggest victory to date, winning the Swedish national championship. This, along with his win in the Route d'Vendée, attracted the attention of Unibet.com Cycling Team who hired him to be a helper to the likes of Baden Cooke and Frank Vandenbroucke.

Major results

1996
 1st  Time trial, National Junior Road Championships
2000
 5th Road race, National Road Championships
 8th Overall Flèche du Sud
 9th Overall International Tour of Rhodes
2001
 1st Stage 4 Okolo Slovenska
 3rd Scandinavian Open Road Race
 5th Road race, UCI Under-23 Road World Championships
2002
 3rd Overall Herald Sun Tour
1st Stage 3
 5th Scandinavian Open Road Race
 8th Paris–Camembert
2003
 7th Overall Ringerike GP
 8th Overall Herald Sun Tour
2004
 1st  Overall Herald Sun Tour
1st Stage 7
 1st  Overall Tour of Queensland
1st Stages 5 & 7
 3rd Scandinavian Open Road Race
 4th Boucles de l'Aulne
 10th Overall Tour de Slovénie
1st Stage 4
2005
 1st  Road race, National Road Championships
 1st Tour du Lac Léman
 1st Tour de Vendée
 1st Melbourne to Warrnambool Classic
 3rd Scandinavian Open Road Race
 3rd E.O.S. Tallinn GP
 5th Giro del Lago Maggiore
 7th Tartu GP
 9th Trofeo Franco Balestra
2006
 3rd Grand Prix de Villers-Cotterêts
 4th Overall Tour de Luxembourg
1st Stage 3
 5th Tour de Vendée
 6th Boucles de l'Aulne
2007
 9th Cholet-Pays de Loire
2008
 1st  Road race, National Road Championships
 1st Stage 3 Vuelta Ciclista a León
 1st Stage 2 Troféu Joaquim Agostinho
 1st Stage 3 Circuit des Ardennes
 10th Overall 
1st Points classification
1st Stage 1
2011
 3rd Tartu GP
 5th Ronde van Noord-Holland
 9th Paris–Camembert

External links
 

1979 births
Living people
Swedish male cyclists
Sportspeople from Gothenburg